Sohar Regional Sports Complex is a multi-use stadium in Sohar, Oman.  It is currently used mostly for football matches and is the home ground of Sohar Club.  The stadium has a capacity of 19,000 spectators.

External links
 Stadium information

Football venues in Oman